Palzer may be either a variant of Pelzer or a habitational surname for someone from the Pfalz. Notable people with the surname include: 
 Al Palzer (1890–1917), American boxer
 Anton Palzer (1993), German ski mountaineer and cyclist
 Jacques Palzer (1900–1979), Luxembourgian gymnast

References

German-language surnames
German toponymic surnames